Sharon Township is one of twenty townships in Fayette County, Illinois, USA.  As of the 2010 census, its population was 2,441 and it contained 425 housing units.

Geography

Cities, towns, villages
 Vandalia (north quarter)

Unincorporated towns
 Vera

Cemeteries
The township contains these three cemeteries: Independence, Sharon and Union.

Major highways
  US Route 51
  Illinois Route 185

Landmarks
 Vandalia Correctional Center (north quarter)

Lakes
 Vandalia Lake

Demographics

School districts
 Ramsey Community Unit School District 204
 Vandalia Community Unit School District 203

Political districts
 Illinois' 19th congressional district
 State House District 102
 State Senate District 51

References
 
 United States Census Bureau 2007 TIGER/Line Shapefiles
 United States National Atlas

External links
 City-Data.com
 Illinois State Archives

Townships in Fayette County, Illinois
Populated places established in 1859
Townships in Illinois
1859 establishments in Illinois